The North Hempstead Country Club (abbreviated as NHCC) is a private country club in the Incorporated Village of Flower Hill, on Long Island, in New York, United States.

Description 
The North Hempstead Country Club is located off of Port Washington Boulevard (NY 101), and features an 18-hole, 70-par golf course designed by A.W. Tillinghast, with many trees and water hazards. The NHCC also features a card room, a pool, tennis courts, and dining facilities. The countrified manor style clubhouse was designed by renowned architect Clifford C. Wendehack. 

Many homes on Country Club Drive in the Port Washington section of Flower Hill border the North Hempstead Country Club. These homes, built by Walter Uhl in the 1930s and 1940s, were amongst the first homes to be built within the Village of Flower Hill.

The North Hempstead Country Club celebrated its centennial in 2016.

History 
The North Hempstead Country Club opened in 1916, partially over the former Burtis Farm. The club purchased the more than 150 acre (61 ha) property on September 7, 1918, for an estimated price of $150,000 to $200,000 (1918 USD).

In 1956, the golf course's design was altered, as some of the easternmost portions of the property were returned to the local sand mining operations that took place nearby at the time. Holes 11-13, 16, and 17 were altered; this reconfiguration was designed by Robert Trent Jones. Following the end of sand mining operations in the area, the golf course's original, A.W. Tillinghast design was restored in a subsequent renovation between 1994 and 1996.

1968 plane crash 
On March 20, 1968, a small plane, piloted by Reuven Jerzy and carrying Leonard Caplan as a passenger, suffered an engine failure over Manhasset Bay whilst Jerzy and Caplan were practicing stalls. As a result, Jerzy and Caplan proceeded to make an emergency landing, and they landed the plane on the North Hempstead Country Club's golf course, ahead of (and avoiding) a group of golfers.

The plane, which was owned by Speed's Flying Service, was dragged off of the fairway, and nobody was hurt in the incident.

1979 discrimination lawsuit 
In September 1979, the North Hempstead Country Club expelled club member William Kirkendale after he critiqued their admissions policy, which barred Black and Jewish people from becoming members of the club. Later that year, Kirkendale filed a $1.25 Million (1979 USD) lawsuit against the club. It was one of the first cases in which a white Christian sued a country club for barring and discriminating against Black and Jewish people. He argued that the club discriminated against minorities, and that the NHCC violated his civil rights by expelling him when he voiced his concern regarding said policy.

The New York State Supreme Court ultimately sided with the club, concluding that a private club can admit whomever they want.

2018 expansion 
In 2018, the North Hempstead Country Club underwent an expansion project. This project saw the club purchase and raze a home for the construction of a driving range.

See also 

 List of golf courses designed by A.W. Tillinghast

References

External links 
Official website

Flower Hill, New York
Town of North Hempstead, New York
Nassau County, New York
Golf clubs and courses designed by A. W. Tillinghast
Golf clubs and courses in New York (state)